Lal Bahadur Shastri College is a college in Jaipur city in Rajasthan state of India.  The college was established in 1963 by Bharat Sewak Shiksha Samiti. The main campus of the college is in Tilak Nagar area of Jaipur.The college offers  undergraduate and post graduate courses.

References
LBS College

Universities and colleges in Jaipur
Memorials to Lal Bahadur Shastri
Educational institutions established in 1963
1963 establishments in Rajasthan